The Stockhorn is a mountain of the Swiss Pennine Alps, located to the southeast of the town of Zermatt. It lies on the range between the Findel and Gorner glaciers, east of the Gornergrat.

The Stockhorn is part of the Zermatt ski area.

References

External links

Stockhorn on Hikr

Mountains of the Alps
Alpine three-thousanders
Mountains of Switzerland
Mountains of Valais

ka:შტოკჰორნი